CBX2 may refer to:
 Fort Nelson/Mobil Sierra Airport
CBX2 (gene)